In Pakistan, a tehsil is an administrative sub-division of a District. Those are sub-divided into union councils. Here is a list of all the tehsils of Gilgit-Baltistan.

Baltistan Division

Ghanche District

 Daghoni Tehsil 
 Khaplu Tehsil
 Mashabrum Tehsil
 Chorbut Tehsil

Rondu District
 Rondu Tehsil (promoted to district in 2019; previously in Skardu District)

Shigar District
 Shigar Tehsil

Skardu District

 Gultari Tehsil
 Skardu Tehsil
 Gamba Tehsil

Kharmang District

Diamer Division

Astore District

 Astore Tehsil
 Shounter Tehsil

Darel District
 Darel Tehsil (promoted to district in 2019; previously in Diamir District)

Diamir District
 Babusar Tehsil
 Chilas Tehsil

Tangir District
 Tangir Tehsil (promoted to district in 2019; previously in Diamir District)

Gilgit Division

Ghizer District

 Punial Tehsil
 Ishkoman Tehsil

Gilgit District

 Danyor Tehsil
 Gilgit Tehsil
 Juglot Tehsil

Gupis-Yasin District
(District created in 2019 from three western tehsils of Ghizer)
 Gupis Tehsil
 Yasin Tehsil
 Phander Tehsil

Hunza District

 Aliabad Tehsil
 Gojal Tehsil

Nagar District
 Nagar-I Tehsil
 Nagar-II Tehsil

 
Tehsils